Andrey Volkov (born 13 November 1986) is a Russian judoka.

He is the gold medallist of the 2016 Judo Grand Slam Tyumen in the +100 kg category.

References

External links
 

1986 births
Living people
Russian male judoka